Florian Nagel (born 13 March 1992) is a German former professional footballer who most recently played as a midfielder for SV Drochtersen/Assel.

External links
 
 
 

1992 births
Living people
People from Stade
German footballers
Footballers from Lower Saxony
Association football midfielders
3. Liga players
Regionalliga players
SV Werder Bremen II players
KSV Hessen Kassel players
SV Drochtersen/Assel players